Carmen Twillie Ambar (born July 3, 1968) is an American attorney, academic, and the current president of Oberlin College in Ohio. She was appointed to the post in May 2017.

In 2002, she became the ninth woman to lead Douglass College and the youngest dean in its history. She was dean of Douglass College until August 2008 when she became president of Cedar Crest College. Ambar was appointed by Governor Corzine to the New Jersey Economic Development Authority Board of Directors. In 2017, she was named 15th president of Oberlin College.

She holds a bachelor's degree in foreign service from the Edmund A. Walsh School of Foreign Service at Georgetown University, a master's degree in public affairs from the Princeton School of Public and International Affairs at Princeton University, and a J.D. degree from Columbia University School of Law. Ambar formerly served as Board Chair for the Public Leadership Education Network and is vice-chair of the New Jersey Commission on the Status of Women. She is a member of the New York State Bar Association and the National Association of Student Personnel Administrators.  From 1994 until 2019, she was married to Saladin Ambar, who is also a graduate of Edmund A. Walsh School at Georgetown University and now teaches political science at the Eagleton Institute of Politics at Rutgers University. He earned his Ph.D. from Rutgers University in 2008. On April 19, 2007, Carmen Ambar gave birth to triplets.

On May 1, 2008, Carmen Ambar was named thirteenth president of Cedar Crest College and was officially inaugurated to the position on October 23, 2009. On May 30, 2017, she was named fifteenth president of Oberlin College, the first black person and the second woman to hold that position.

References

External links
 Biography at Oberlin College
 Biography at Douglass College

1968 births
Living people
Columbia Law School alumni
Walsh School of Foreign Service alumni
Princeton School of Public and International Affairs alumni
Rutgers University alumni
Rutgers University faculty
Presidents of Oberlin College
Lawyers from Little Rock, Arkansas
Women heads of universities and colleges
African-American academics
21st-century African-American people
20th-century African-American people